Andrew Bowman (7 March 1934 – 2 March 2009) was a Scottish footballer who played most of his career with Hearts. He played as a wing half.

Playing career
He played for the Scottish schoolboy international side in 1949 which brought him to the attention of Chelsea who signed him in 1951 on his 17th birthday. He played only one game in Chelsea's league team in 1953–54 season.

He moved to Hearts in 1955 for a transfer fee of £1,000. Bowman won the Scottish League in 1957–58 and 1959–60, and the 1959 Scottish League Cup Final while with Hearts. He made 135 appearances for Hearts, scoring eight goals.

He then signed for Newport County in 1961, before moving on to non-league Tonbridge.

After a spell in the United States, he returned to Scotland, playing for Hamilton Academical and Hawick Royal Albert.

Off the pitch

After retiring from football he spent most of his working life with Scottish & Newcastle breweries.

His son David followed him into professional football.

Andy Bowman died on 2 March 2009, following a heart attack, having suffered from Alzheimer's disease during his latter years.

References

External links

1934 births
2009 deaths
People from Pittenweem
Scottish footballers
Association football wing halves
Chelsea F.C. players
Heart of Midlothian F.C. players
Newport County A.F.C. players
Tonbridge Angels F.C. players
Hamilton Academical F.C. players
English Football League players
Scottish Football League players
Hawick Royal Albert F.C. players
Stenhousemuir F.C. players
Footballers from Fife